Meyer is a census-designated place located in Stacyville Township in northern portion of Mitchell County in the state of Iowa, United States. As of the 2010 census, the population was 31.

Demographics

History
Meyer's population was 99 in 1925.

References

Unincorporated communities in Mitchell County, Iowa
Unincorporated communities in Iowa